Windows Advanced Rasterization Platform (WARP) is a software rasterizer and a component of DirectX graphics runtime in Windows 7 and later. It is available for Windows Vista and Windows Server 2008 through platform update for Windows Vista.

WARP can be used when no compatible hardware is available, in kernel mode applications or in a headless environment, or for remote rendering of Direct2D/DirectWrite for Remote Desktop Connection clients.

WARP is a full-featured Direct3D 10.1 renderer device with performance on par with current low-end graphics cards, such as Intel GMA 3000, when running on multi-core CPUs. To achieve this level of rendering performance, WARP employs advanced techniques such as just-in-time compilation to x86 machine code and support for advanced vector extensions such as SSE2 and SSE4.1.

WARP supports Direct3D 11 runtime and is compatible with feature levels 10_1, 10_0, 9_3, 9_2, and 9_1; in Direct3D 11.1 runtime, WARP additionally supports feature levels 11_0 and 11_1.

In Windows 8, WARP provides functionality for the "Microsoft Basic Render Driver" which replaces kernel-mode VGA driver. In Windows 8.1, WARP has been updated to support feature level 11_1 and tiled resources.

In Windows 10, WARP has been updated to support Direct3D 12 at feature level 12_1; under Direct3D 12, WARP also replaces the Reference rasterizer.

References

External links
MSDN - Windows Advanced Rasterization Platform (WARP) Guide

DirectX
Windows 7